Bill Graham (born Wulf Wolodia Grajonca; January 8, 1931 – October 25, 1991) was a German-American impresario and rock concert promoter from the 1960s until his death in 1991 in a helicopter crash. On July 4, 1939, he was sent from Germany to France due to political uncertainty in his home country. At age 10, he settled into a foster home in the Bronx, New York. Graham graduated from DeWitt Clinton High School and subsequently from City College with a business degree.

In the early 1960s, Graham moved to San Francisco, and in 1965, began to manage the San Francisco Mime Troupe. He had teamed up with local Haight Ashbury promoter Chet Helms to organize a benefit concert, then promoted several free concerts. This eventually turned into a profitable full-time career and he assembled a talented staff. Graham had a profound influence around the world, sponsoring the musical renaissance of the 1960s from its epicenter in San Francisco.  Chet Helms and then Graham made famous the Fillmore and Winterland Ballroom; these turned out to be a proving grounds for rock bands and acts of the San Francisco Bay area including the Grateful Dead, Jefferson Airplane, and Big Brother and the Holding Company with Janis Joplin, who were first managed, and in some cases developed, by Helms.

Early life
Graham was born on January 8, 1931, in Berlin, the youngest child and only son of Jewish lower middle-class parents, Frieda (née Sass) and Jacob "Yankel" Grajonca, who had emigrated from Russia before the rise of Nazism. There were six children in the Grajonca family. His father died accidentally two days after his son's birth. Graham's family nicknamed him "Wolfgang" early in life.

Due to the increasing peril to Jews in Germany and because of the death of Jacob, Graham's mother placed her son and her youngest daughter, Tanya "Tolla", in a Berlin orphanage, which sent them to France in a pre-Holocaust exchange of Jewish children for Christian orphans. Graham's older sisters Sonja and Ester stayed behind with their mother. After the fall of France, Graham was among a group of Jewish orphans spirited out of France, some of whom finally reached the United States. Tolla Grajonca came down with pneumonia and did not survive the difficult journey. Graham was one of the One Thousand Children (OTC), mainly Jewish children who managed to flee Hitler and Europe and come directly to North America, but whose parents were forced to stay behind. Graham's mother died in Auschwitz.

Once in the United States, Graham was placed in a foster home in The Bronx. After being taunted as an immigrant and being called a Nazi because of his German-accented English, Graham worked on his accent, eventually being able to speak in a perfect New York accent. He changed his name to sound more "American". (He found "Graham" in the phone book—it was the closest he could find to his birth surname, "Grajonca". According to Graham, both "Bill" and "Graham" were meaningless to him.) Graham graduated from DeWitt Clinton High School and then obtained a business degree from the City College of New York. He was later quoted as describing his training as that of an "efficiency expert".

Graham was drafted into the United States Army in 1951, and served in the Korean War, where he was awarded both the Bronze Star and Purple Heart. Upon his return to the States he worked as a waiter/maître d' in Catskill Mountain resorts in upstate New York during their heyday. He was quoted saying that his experience as a maître d' and with the poker games he hosted behind the scenes was good training for his eventual career as a promoter. Tito Puente, who played some of these resorts, went on record saying that Graham was avid to learn Spanish from him, but only cared about the curse words. He also mentions in his bio-pic Last Days At The Fillmore working for Minnesota Mining.

Career

Fillmore Auditorium (December 10, 1965 – July 4, 1968)
Graham moved from New York to San Francisco in the early 1960s to be closer to his sister Rita. He was invited to attend a free concert in Golden Gate Park, produced by Chet Helms and the Diggers, where he made contact with the San Francisco Mime Troupe, a radical theater group. After Mime Troupe leader R. G. Davis was arrested on obscenity charges during an outdoor performance, Graham organized a benefit concert to cover the troupe's legal fees. The concert was a success and Graham saw a business opportunity.

Graham began promoting more concerts with Chet Helms and Family Dog projects, which provided a vital function of the 1960s, promoting concerts that provided a social meeting place to network, where many ideologies were given a forum, sometimes even on stage, such as peace movements, civil rights, farm workers and others. Most of his shows were performed at rented venues, and Graham saw a need for more permanent locations of his own. 

Charles Sullivan was a mid-20th-century entrepreneur and businessman in San Francisco who owned the master lease on the Fillmore Auditorium. Graham approached Sullivan to put on the Second Mime Troupe appeals concert at the Fillmore Auditorium on December 10, 1965, using Sullivan's dance hall permit for the show. Graham later secured a contract from Sullivan for the open dates at the Fillmore Auditorium in 1966. Graham credits Sullivan with giving him his break in the music concert hall business.

The Fillmore trademark and franchise has defined music promotion in the United States for the last 50 years. From 2003 to 2013 auxiliary writers of the times surrounding the 1960s, and Graham family lawsuits, tell the narrative of the Fillmore phenomena and how the Black community there was disenfranchised. The best way to set the historic record straight concerning Charles Sullivan and Bill Graham is to review what Graham left in his own words. Historically the first time Graham mentioned Charles Sullivan, in print, was in a Bay Area Music article from 1988:

Although Graham acknowledged Sullivan's part he historically has never revealed how he got the lease to the Fillmore Auditorium and how and when he trademarked the Fillmore brand, which by all historical accounts belonged to Sullivan. In a handbill from Graham's first show at the Fillmore Auditorium, "The Mime Troupe is holding another appeal party Friday night, December 10th, at the Fillmore Auditorium", Bill Graham gives a general impression of the Fillmore neighborhood:

Mime Troupe leader R. G. Davis states that, "Graham... gets very excited about the success of the Fillmore Auditorium Show. He gets a contract with the black guy who owned the Fillmore. He nails it. Closed." On pages 150–156 of his autobiography, Graham outlined his battles with City Hall in getting a dance hall permit. By schmoozing with merchants and having criminologists and sociologists from U.C. Berkeley and U.C. Santa Cruz giving merit to the shows Graham managed to obtain a second permit hearing, but was again denied. He reported that Sullivan came to him sometime in March or April and announced he had to pull his dance hall permit. The morning of the next day, when Graham was returning to move out of his office in the Fillmore Auditorium, Sullivan met him on the steps. Graham claimed Sullivan poured out his life story, concluding with a pledge of support to Graham to beat City Hall. Graham added, "He was the guy, Charles. He was it. I don't know if I could have ever found another place. Why would I have even tried? That was the place."

Graham was denied by the Board of Permit Appeals who refused to overrule the first denial. Graham then stated, "Then on April 21, 1966, a Thursday, the Chronicle ran an editorial, 'The Fillmore Auditorium Case' ... [I]t was a big turning point for me. In more ways than one"; he secured his permit. He later reported, "A few months later, Charles Sullivan got himself killed. He had a bad habit of always carrying a roll of money with him. He was proud of his work and proud of the fact that he earned a good living and always carried a roll. They jumped him and stabbed him to death. I went to his funeral in Colma, California. It was small, mostly family. Had that not happened, I think I would have done anything Charles wanted. Just out of gratitude."

Charles Sullivan was found shot dead at 1:45 am on August 2, 1966, at 5th and Bluxome Streets, San Francisco (South of Market industrial area near the train station). Sullivan had just returned from Los Angeles, where he had presented a weekend concert starring soul singer James Brown. The police were unable to determine whether Sullivan's death was suicide or homicide. The homicide remains unsolved. Sullivan was laid to rest on August 8, 1966, according to the Sun Reporter, which reported that "Last respects were paid Charles Sullivan Monday, Aug. 8, when hundreds crowded into Jones Memorial Methodist Church, 1975 Post St. from 11:30 a.m. to view Sullivan for the last time. An enormous crowd had gathered by 1 p.m. to hear the eulogy for a friend." The funeral announcement is accompanied by photographs of the actual funeral covering two pages in which police are stopping traffic to assist the motorcade to the cemetery in Colma.

After Graham's death on October 25, 1991 the description of his funeral procession states:

Of note in the articles surrounding Sullivan's death is an interesting fact pointed out in The Sun Reporter: 
 

According to the historical record, Sullivan also gave the Fillmore Auditorium its name.

Graham's struggle to get his dance hall permit in 1966 was described in an article in Billboard Magazine, July 11, 1966. San Francisco music critic Ralph Gleason, in defense of Graham's Fillmore Auditorium scene, wrote that Graham got a three-year lease for the Fillmore Auditorium from Charles Sullivan and was still struggling to procure his dance hall permit, a fact never publicly revealed by Graham. Charles Sullivan's last show at the Fillmore Auditorium came a week before his death, on July 26, 1966, The Temptations Dance and Show. Graham must have gotten his permit in mid-July 1966, confirming his possession of the Fillmore brand. 

When and how did Bill Graham take possession of the Fillmore Auditorium lease? The answer came in 2004: Hendrik Hertzberg's Politics Observations & Arguments (1966-2004) contains an article, "The San Francisco Sound, New music, new subculture", at the end of which it stated, "Unpublished file for Newsweek, October 28, 1966". This article contains the only published account of how Graham acquired the Fillmore. In the beginning, Hertzberg recounts familiar territory with the Mime Troupe, reducing the Fillmore Auditorium to a run-down ballroom in "SF's biggest negro ghetto." After the success of the Fillmore Auditorium Mime Troupe shows, Graham parts ways with the Troupe: "He went back to the Fillmore and found that eleven other promoters had already put in bids for it. Graham got forty-one prominent citizens to write letters to the auditorium's owner, a haberdasher named Harry Shifs, and Shifs gave him a three-year lease at five hundred dollars a month.... [T]he hippie community ... has turned out to be something the man from Montgomery Street can point to with pride, in a left-handed way, and say 'these are our boys'", stated Jerry Garcia.

One of the early concerts Graham sponsored, with Chet Helms hired to promote it, featured the Paul Butterfield Blues Band. The concert was an overwhelming success and Graham saw an opportunity with the band. Early the next morning, Graham's secretary called the band's manager, Albert Grossman, and obtained exclusive rights to promote them. Shortly thereafter, Chet Helms arrived at Graham's office, asking how Graham could have cut him out of the deal. Graham pointed out that Helms would not have known about it unless he had tried to do the same thing to Graham. He advised Helms to "get up early" in the future. Graham produced shows attracting elements of America's now-legendary 1960s counterculture such as the Jefferson Airplane, Big Brother and the Holding Company, Country Joe and the Fish, Lawrence Ferlinghetti, the improv group The Committee, The Fugs, Allen Ginsberg, and a particular favorite of Graham's, the Grateful Dead. He was the manager of the Jefferson Airplane during 1967 and 1968. His staff's amount of resourcefulness, success, popularity, and personal contacts with artists and fans alike was one reason Graham became the top rock concert promoter in the San Francisco Bay Area.

Fillmore Records, West, East, and later
Graham owned Fillmore Records, which was in operation from 1969 to 1976. Some of those who signed with Graham included Rod Stewart, Elvin Bishop, and Cold Blood, although of these it seems only Bishop actually issued albums on the Fillmore label.  Tower of Power was signed to Bill Graham's San Francisco Records and their first album, East Bay Grease, was recorded  in 1970.

By 1971, Graham citing financial reasons and changes he saw as unwelcome in the music industry, closed the Fillmore East and West, claiming a need to "find [himself]". The movie Fillmore and the album Fillmore: The Last Days document the closing of the Fillmore West. Graham later returned to promoting. He began organizing concerts at smaller venues, like the Berkeley Community Theatre on the campus of Berkeley High School. He then reopened the Winterland Arena (San Francisco), along with the Fillmore West, and promoted shows at the Cow Palace Arena in Daly City and other venues. 

In 1973 he did the staging for Jimmy Koplic and Shelly Finkle's promotion of the largest outdoor concert at Watkins Glen, New York with The Band, Grateful Dead, and The Allman Brothers Band. Over 600,000 paying ticket-holders were in attendance. He continued promoting stadium-sized concerts at Kezar Stadium in San Francisco with Led Zeppelin in 1973 and 1977 and started a series of outdoor stadium concerts at the Oakland Coliseum each billed as Day on the Green in 1973 until 1992. These concerts featured billings such as the Grateful Dead and The Who on October 9, 1976, and the Grateful Dead and Bob Dylan in 1987.

His first large-scale outdoor benefit concert, at Kezar Stadium, on Sunday, March 23, 1975, "SF SNACK", was organized to replace funds for after-school programs canceled by the San Francisco Unified School District, with performances by Bob Dylan, Neil Young, members of The Band and Grateful Dead, Jefferson Starship, Mimi Fariña, Joan Baez, Santana, Tower of Power, Jerry Garcia & Friends, The Doobie Brothers, Eddie Palmieri & His Orchestra, The Miracles, Graham Central Station,  and appearing : Marlon Brando, Francis Ford Coppola, Frankie Albert, John Brodie, Rosie Casals, Werner Erhard, Cedric Hardman, Willie Mays, Jesse Owens, Gene Washington, Cecil Williams

Graham as Bill Graham Presents booked the 1982 US Festival, funded by Steve Wozniak as Unuson. In the mid-1980s, in conjunction with the city of Mountain View, California, and Apple Inc. cofounder Steve Wozniak, he masterminded the creation of the Shoreline Amphitheatre, which became the premier venue for outdoor concerts in Silicon Valley, complementing his booking of the East Bay Concord Pavilion. Throughout his career, Graham promoted benefit concerts. He went on to set the standard for well-produced large-scale rock concerts, such as the U.S. portion of Live Aid at JFK Stadium, Philadelphia, Pennsylvania on July 13, 1985, as well as the 1986 A Conspiracy of Hope and 1988 Human Rights Now! tours for Amnesty International.

Graham purchased comedy club  The Punch Line and The Old Waldorf on Battery Street in San Francisco from local promoter Jeffrey Pollack, with whom he remained close friends for the rest of his life, then Wolfgang's on Columbus Ave in San Francisco.

After the smaller operations failed, the remaining one, Ticketmaster (formerly BASS), raised prices to unprecedented levels. Its only opposition came from a few bands, notably Pearl Jam, which protested that the company's high ticketing fees were unfair to music fans. Such practices were targeted by the California Senate in S.B. 815.

Personal life

 Family 
Bill Graham had five sisters, Rita Rose; Evelyn (or "Echa") Udray; Sonja (or "Sonia") Szobel; Ester Chichinsky; and Tanya (or "Tolla") Grajonca, however his youngest sister Tolla died of pneumonia while fleeing the Holocaust. Rita and Ester moved to the United States and were close to Graham in his later life. Evelyn and Sonja escaped the Holocaust, first to Shanghai, and later, after the war, to Europe. Graham's nephew and Sonia Szobel's son is musician Hermann Szobel.

Graham married Bonnie MacLean on June 11, 1967 and they had one child, David (born 1968); after many years of not living together the couple divorced in 1975. With Marcia Sult Godinez, Graham had another son; Alex Graham-Sult and a stepson, Thomas Sult.

 Home estate 
For many years Graham lived in Mill Valley, California, on a 11-acre estate with a ranch-style house he named "Masada". The house was replaced in the early 2000s, and later occupied by WeWork CEO, Adam Neumann.

 Bitburg controversy 

Graham's status as a Holocaust survivor came into play in 1985, during the presidency of Ronald Reagan. When Graham learned that Reagan intended to lay a wreath at Bitburg's World War II cemetery where SS soldiers were also buried, he took out a full page ad in the San Francisco Chronicle newspaper in protest. During the same month that Reagan visited the cemetery, Graham's San Francisco office was firebombed by Neo-Nazis. Graham was in France at the time, meeting with Bob Geldof to organize the first Live Aid concert. When he was informed of the fire via telephone, he responded by asking immediately, "Was anybody hurt?" It was only after he was told that everyone was OK that he asked, "Is anything left?" Graham eventually led an effort to build a large menorah which is lit during every Hanukkah in downtown San Francisco.

 Acting 
Graham had long dreamed of being a character actor. He appeared in Apocalypse Now in a small role as a promoter. In 1990, he was cast as Charles "Lucky" Luciano in the film Bugsy. During one scene, he is shown in a Latin dance number, a style of dancing Graham had embraced as a teenager in New York. He also appears as a promoter in the 1991 Oliver Stone film The Doors, which he also co-produced. He had a small part in Gardens of Stone as Don Brubaker, a hippie anti-war protester.

Death

Graham was killed in a helicopter crash west of  Vallejo, California, on October 25, 1991, while returning home from a Huey Lewis and the News concert at the Concord Pavilion. Graham had attended the event to discuss promoting a benefit concert for the victims of the 1991 Oakland hills firestorm. Once he had obtained a commitment from Huey Lewis to perform, he returned to his helicopter. Flying in severe weather, with rain and gusty winds, the aircraft flew off course and too low over the tidal marshland north of San Pablo Bay. The Bell Jet Ranger flew directly into a 223-foot (68-meter) high-voltage tower near where Highway 37, which runs between Vallejo, California, and Marin County, California, crosses Sonoma Creek. The helicopter burst into flames on impact, killing Graham, pilot and advance man Steve "Killer" Kahn, and Graham's girlfriend, Melissa Gold (née Dilworth), ex-wife of author Herbert Gold. The charred remains of the helicopter hung in the tower for more than a day.

Aftermath and tributes
Following his death, his company, Bill Graham Presents (BGP), was taken over by a group of employees. Graham's sons remained a core part of the new management team. The new owners sold the company to SFX Promotions, which in turn sold the company to Clear Channel Entertainment. The BGP staff did not embrace the Clear Channel name, and several members of the Graham staff eventually left the company. Former BGP President/CEO Gregg Perloff and former Senior Vice President Sherry Wasserman left and started their own company, Another Planet Entertainment. Eventually Clear Channel separated itself from concert promotion and formed Live Nation, which is managed by many former Clear Channel executives.

Live Nation is now the world's largest concert production/promotion company and is no longer legally affiliated with Clear Channel or the names Winterland or Winterland Productions.

In tribute, the San Francisco Civic Auditorium was renamed the Bill Graham Civic Auditorium. On November 3, 1991, a free concert called "Laughter, Love and Music" was held at Golden Gate Park to honor Graham, Gold and Kahn. An estimated 300,000 people attended to view many of the entertainment acts Graham had supported including Santana, the Grateful Dead, John Fogerty, Robin Williams, Journey (reunited), and Crosby, Stills, Nash & Young (reunited). The video for "I'll Get By" from Eddie Money's album Right Here was dedicated to Graham. Graham's images and poster artwork still adorn the office walls at Live Nation's new San Francisco office. With the band Hardline, Neal Schon of Journey composed a piece entitled "31–91" in 1992 in Graham's honor. 

Bill Graham was inducted into the "Rock and Roll Hall of Fame" in 1992 in the "Non-Performer" category. Graham was inducted into the Rock Radio Hall of Fame in the "Without Whom" category in 2014.

See also
 Bill Graham Archives v. Dorling Kindersley, Ltd., 448 F.3d 605 (2d Cir. 2006)—fair use

References

Further reading
 Rage & Roll:  Bill Graham and the Selling of Rock (1993) by John Glatt; 
 Tito Puente: When the Drums are Dreaming'' (2007) by Josephine Powell;

External links

Bill Graham Foundation
Bill Graham Civic Auditorium

Bill Graham interview with Robert Greenfield, famousinterview.ca/interviews/bill_graham.htm; accessed May 7, 2014.
"Concert Archive Draws Digital Suit", December 2006 MP3 Newswire article about the fight over "Wolfgang's Vault" and the digital rights to the Bill Graham concert legacy
Bill Graham's Stairway to Heaven..., check-six.com; accessed May 7, 2014.
The Houston Freeburg Collection website; accessed May 7, 2014. 
Wolfgang's Vault—contains live music audio/video 
Kenny Wardell of 106 KMEL Interviews Bill Graham, kmelforever.com; accessed May 7, 2014.
A Video of 106 KMEL Broadcasting Live from Bill Graham's House, kmelforever.com; accessed May 7, 2014

 

1931 births
1991 deaths
20th-century American businesspeople
Accidental deaths in California
United States Army personnel of the Korean War
American music industry executives
American music managers
Businesspeople from the San Francisco Bay Area
Deaths from fire in the United States
DeWitt Clinton High School alumni
Impresarios
Jewish American military personnel
Music of the San Francisco Bay Area
Music promoters
People from Mount Pleasant, New York
United States Army soldiers
Victims of aviation accidents or incidents in 1991
Victims of helicopter accidents or incidents in the United States
People from Berlin
20th-century American Jews